Limnobaris is a genus of beetles belonging to the family Curculionidae.

The species of this genus are found in Europe, Japan and Northern America.

Species:
 Limnobaris aeneola Champion, 1908 
 Limnobaris aeraria Champion, 1908

References

Curculionidae
Curculionidae genera